Sir Ahmadu Bello International Airport (SABIA)  is an airport serving Birnin Kebbi in the Kebbi State of Nigeria.

The Birnin Kebbi VOR-DME (Ident: BIK) is located on the field.

The airport started full operations in 2014, and since then Muslim pilgrims from Kebbi state were flown from SABIA to Jedda International Airport in Saudi Arabia. The airport also has scheduled and unscheduled domestic flights. The scheduled flights to Abuja were via Airpeace prior to Azman Air, which is currently the major airline operating from SABIA.

Airlines and destinations

See also
Transport in Nigeria
List of airports in Nigeria

References

 Google Earth

External links
OurAirports - Kebbi
SkyVector Aeronautical Charts

Airports in Nigeria